Santiago González Portillo (25 July 1818 – 1 August 1887) was a Salvadoran military officer and general who served as the President of El Salvador from 15 April 1871 to 1 February 1876.

Biography 

Santiago González Portillo was born on 25 July 1818 in Zacapa, Guatemala. He married Soledad Fortis on 1 March 1866.

He served as President of the Legislative Assembly in 1862 and again in 1863 during the presidency of Captain General Gerardo Barrios. During the War of 1863, he fought alongside Barrios at the Battle of Coatepeque. He later deserted Barrios and joined the invading Guatemalans under Rafael Carrera. Under the new government of Francisco Dueñas, he served as the Minister of War of El Salvador from 1863 until 1871, when he led a revolution against Dueñas' conservative government, which was overthrown. He also amended the constitution. He became President of El Salvador after his revolution and served until 1876.

He served as Vice President and commander-in-chief of the army during the term of his successor, Andrés del Valle.

He died on 1 August 1887 in San Salvador.

References 

1818 births
1887 deaths
Presidents of El Salvador
Vice presidents of El Salvador
People from Zacapa Department
National Liberal Party (El Salvador) politicians
Salvadoran military personnel
19th-century Salvadoran people